The 2017 Americas Challenge  was a curling challenge taking place from January 27 to 29 at the Duluth Curling Club in Duluth, Minnesota. The challenge round was held to determine which nation would qualify for the last Americas Zone spot at the 2017 Ford World Men's Curling Championship and the 2017 World Women's Curling Championship. Brazil and the United States played a best-of-five series to determine the winner in both the men's and women's event.

Background
The World Curling Federation allots two spots at the World Men's Curling Championship to the Americas Zone, which are normally taken by Canada and the United States. However, the World Curling Federation allows for other member nations in the Americas Zone (i.e. Brazil) to challenge Canada and/or the United States for berths to the World Championships. As hosts, Canada received an automatic berth to the 2017 World Men's Championships. Canada finished higher than the United States at the 2016 Ford World Women's Curling Championship, and thus received an automatic berth to the 2017 World Women's Championships, meaning Brazil was allowed to challenge the United States rather than Canada for a berth to the 2017 World Championships. This was Brazil's fourth men's challenge of the United States, after challenges in 2015, 2010 and 2009 proved to be unsuccessful. This was the first women's Americas Challenge.

Men's event

Teams
The teams are listed as follows:

Results

Game 1
Friday, January 27, 14:30

Game 2
Friday, January 27, 19:30

Game 3
Saturday, January 28, 11:00

 advanced to the World Championship.

Women's event

Teams
The teams are listed as follows:

Results

Game 1
Friday, January 27, 14:30

Game 2
Friday, January 27, 19:30

Game 3
Saturday, January 28, 11:00

 advanced to the World Championship.

References

Americas Challenge
Curling in Minnesota
Curling competitions in the United States
Sports competitions in Duluth, Minnesota
Americas Challenge
Americas Challenge
Americas Challenge
21st century in Duluth, Minnesota